John Tolliday (born 14 December 1947) was an English cricketer. He was a right-handed batsman who played for Devon. He was born in Exeter.

Tolliday, who made his Minor Counties Championship debut for the team in the 1967 season, made two List A appearances in the Gillette Cup, the first in 1978 and the second the following year.

Having scored a duck from the opening order in his debut, he was moved slightly down the order in his second match, in which he scored 10 runs.

Wilfred Rhodes Trophy 1971

External links
John Tolliday at Cricket Archive

1947 births
Living people
English cricketers
Devon cricketers